Howard Golden (born November 6, 1925) is an American lawyer and Democratic politician who served as the Borough President of Brooklyn from January 3, 1977 to December 31, 2001. He concurrently served as chairman of the Brooklyn Democratic Party from January 1984 to October 1990.

Personal life
Howard Golden was born in Flatbush, Brooklyn on November 6, 1925. His father ran a delicatessen. Golden grew up in Hell's Kitchen, Manhattan and Bensonhurst, Brooklyn, where he attended public schools. He graduated from Stuyvesant High School and New York University before attending Brooklyn Law School on the G.I. Bill, graduating in 1958. He served in the U.S. Navy during World War II, and was part of the Normandy Invasion on June 6, 1944.

Golden married Aileen Wolsky and has two daughters.

Political life
Prior to becoming Brooklyn Borough President, Golden served as City Councilman for the Borough Park section of Brooklyn for almost seven years.

In the November 1976 election, Brooklyn Borough President Sebastian Leone ran for a judicial seat on the New York Supreme Court instead of running for re-election as borough president. He won, and resigned on December 31 to take his new position. The New York City Council selected Golden to serve as interim borough president until the next election. Golden decided to run for the office in the following election, and in November 1977 he won a four-way race by a wide margin.

Golden became the Kings County Democratic Leader following the retirement of Meade Esposito in 1984.

Throughout his career Golden held various party positions, including Chairman of the Kings County Democratic County Committee, Chairman of the Executive Committee of the Kings County Democratic Party, member of the New York State Democratic Committee and member of the Democratic National Committee. Golden served as a Democratic State Committeeman (in a district encompassing the Borough Park and Kensington neighborhoods) from 1966 until 1989 when the revised New York City Charter forced him to give up his district and county leadership positions. Golden's Roosevelt Democratic Club was one of the powerhouse Democratic organizations in New York City for several decades and was the political home to numerous elected officials, commissioners and judges.

Golden was a New York powerbroker and many of his political protégés achieved higher office through his personal intervention. Golden's two deputy borough presidents went on to higher office. Ed Towns went on to serve as the U.S. Congressman representing the western portion of Brooklyn and William C. Thompson, Jr. was the New York City comptroller. Thompson was the runner-up in the race for Mayor of New York in the 2009 election. Golden's female counterpart as Borough Park Democratic District Leader, Evelyn J. Aquila, served as vice chair of the New York State Democratic Party from 1982 to 1992 and has been one of the two Democratic Commissioners of the New York State Board of Elections since 1992, roles usually reserved for Democratic county leaders or former elected officials. Golden's successor as Brooklyn Borough President was Marty Markowitz, who had served for many years as the state senator representing Golden's home district. Golden had supported his Deputy Jeannette Gadson in that election. In 1983, as Borough President, Golden proclaimed March 10 to be an annual "Grand Prospect Hall Day" in Brooklyn.

References

1925 births
Living people
Brooklyn borough presidents
Brooklyn Law School alumni
New York City Council members
New York (state) Democrats
Stuyvesant High School alumni
United States Navy personnel of World War II